René Blattmann (born January 28, 1948) is a Bolivian judge, lawyer and politician who is a judge of the International Criminal Court. Prior to his appointment to the ICC Blattmann served as Bolivia's minister for justice and human rights.

Early life and education 
Blattmann was born to a father of Swiss descent and studied law at the University of Basel between 1967 and 1971. After graduation, he taught at several universities in Bolivia and abroad.

Political career 
In 1993 Blattmann entered politics with the Revolutionary Nationalist Movement (MNR), serving as the Minister of Justice. He introduced several reforms in regards to human rights.  In the presidential elections of 2002, he was the presidential candidate for the Movimiento Ciudadano para el Cambio (MCC). He campaigned for introducing the mechanism of the referendum inspired by the Swiss democracy in Bolivian politics, but was not elected.

Juridical career 
Judge Blattmann was elected to the ICC from the Latin American and Caribbean group of states and is a member of List B, the list of judges whose experience is in the field of human rights law and international law. He was elected for a six-year term in 2003, and although that term expired in 2009 he remained in office for the duration of the trial of Thomas Lubanga. He was assigned to the court's trial division and sits as a member of Trial Chamber I. In 2012 Blattmans term ended.

Personal life 
René is the grandson of Karl Blattmann, a Swiss immigrant to Cachuela Esperanza, Bolivia. He is married to Marianne Schassner and has three children. He does not have a Swiss passport.

Awards 
1995 Emblema de Oro from the Bolivian police

1998 Honorary doctorate from the University of Basel

2001 Carl Bertelsmann Prize for the transformation towards democracy during his term as a Minister of Justice. Together with Ana Maria Romero.

References

1948 births
20th-century Bolivian lawyers
21st-century Bolivian judges
International Criminal Court judges
Living people
Bolivian judges of international courts and tribunals
Candidates in the 2002 Bolivian presidential election